Royden Dickey Lipscomb (born September 21, 1936), known professionally as Dickey Lee (sometimes misspelled Dickie or Dicky), is an American pop/country singer and songwriter, best known for the 1960s teenage tragedy songs "Patches" and "Laurie (Strange Things Happen)". He also has a number of hit songs on the country charts in the 1970s, including "Rocky" and "9,999,999 Tears", and has written or co-written songs recorded by other singers, such as "She Thinks I Still Care", "The Door Is Always Open" and "The Keeper of the Stars".

Career
Lee formed a country trio while he was still at school at the age of 16, performing at his school and local functions. In 1957–58,
Lee made his first two recordings, "Dream Boy" and "Stay True Baby", in his hometown of Memphis for Tampa Records, later released two songs for Sun Records in, although the song were only regional hits.  He moved to Texas, and  achieved his first chart success in 1962, when his composition "She Thinks I Still Care" was a hit for George Jones (later recorded by Elvis Presley, Connie Francis, Leon Russell, and later Anne Murray as "He Thinks I Still Care"). Glen Campbell also recorded the song for his final album, Adios.  Later that year, "Patches", written by Barry Mann and Larry Kobler and recorded by Lee for Smash Records, rose to No. 6. The song tells in waltz-time the story of teenage lovers of different social classes whose parents forbid their love.  The girl drowns herself in the "dirty old river". The singer concludes: "It may not be right, but I'll join you tonight/ Patches I'm coming to you."  Because of the teen suicide theme, the song was banned by a number of radio stations.  However, it sold over one million copies and was awarded a gold disc. It is in this period that he changed his name legally from Royden Dickey Lipscomb to Dickey Lee after a man of a similar name attempted to sue him for using his name.

Lee had a No. 14 hit in 1963 with a song he co-wrote, a conventional rocker, "I Saw Linda Yesterday". In 1965, he returned to teen tragedy with "Laurie (Strange Things Happen)", a song related to the urban legends known as the vanishing hitchhiker and Resurrection Mary. He focused primarily on production and songwriting in the late 60s. 

Lee returned to Nashville in 1969 and signed with RCA, and started releasing songs to the country chart in 1970. His 1970s country hits as a singer include two remakes of pop songs, Delaney & Bonnie's "Never Ending Song of Love" and Austin Roberts's "Rocky" (another bitter-sweet song, written by Ronald Johnson – aka Woody P. Snow), in addition to original songs such as "Angels, Roses, and Rain", and "9,999,999 Tears". 

Lee co-wrote several songs with Bob McDill, including "Someone Like You" (by Emmylou Harris), "I've Been Around Enough To Know" (first recorded by Jo-El Sonnier in 1973, but would become a No. 1 hit in 1984 for John Schneider), and "The Door is Always Open" (by several artists, most notably by Dave and Sugar). He also co-wrote the 1994 Tracy Byrd hit, "The Keeper of the Stars", and has written or co-written songs for a number of other prominent country artists, including George Strait, Charley Pride, and Reba McEntire.

He was inducted into the Nashville Songwriters Hall of Fame in 1995, and the Country Music Hall of Fame in 2015. Lee is included as co-writer and singer on singer-songwriter Michael Saxell's 2005 album Wonky Windmill on the song "Two Men." In 1987 Dickey Lee became a lifetime member of the prestigious Nashville, Tn. organization (R.O.P.E.) Reunion of Professional Entertainers.

Discography

Albums

Singles

References

External links
 [ Allmusic]
NAMM Oral History Interview July 10, 2015

1936 births
Living people
American country guitarists
American male guitarists
American country singer-songwriters
Mercury Records artists
Musicians from Memphis, Tennessee
RCA Records artists
Sun Records artists
Smash Records artists
Singer-songwriters from Tennessee
Guitarists from Tennessee
20th-century American guitarists
Country musicians from Tennessee
20th-century American male musicians